The Lancia D50 was a Formula One racing car designed by Vittorio Jano for Lancia in 1954. The car's design made use of many innovative features, such as the use of the engine as a stressed chassis member, the off-centre positioning of the engine to allow a lower overall height, and pannier fuel cells for better weight distribution and aerodynamics.  Six of the cars were built, and two of them are displayed in Italian museums.

Description

The D50 made its race debut toward the end of the 1954 Formula One season in the hands of two-time and reigning World Champion, Italian driver Alberto Ascari. In its very first event Ascari took both pole position in qualifying and fastest race lap, although his car's clutch failed after only ten laps. Following Ascari's death, and in increasing financial trouble, the Lancia family sold their controlling share in the Lancia company, and the assets of Scuderia Lancia were given to Scuderia Ferrari. Ferrari continued to develop the car, although they removed many of Jano's most innovative designs, and the car was rebadged as the "Lancia-Ferrari D50" and later simply the "Ferrari D50". Juan Manuel Fangio won the 1956 World Championship of Drivers with this car modified by Ferrari. During their competition lifespan D50s were entered into 14 World Championship Formula One Grands Prix, winning five.

Ferrari 801
The D50s lived on into the 1957 season, much modified as "Ferrari 801s" but were largely uncompetitive against the latest generation of Maserati 250Fs.

Complete Formula One World Championship results
(key) (results in bold indicate pole position, results in italics indicate fastest lap)

 Shared drive

References

Notes

Bibliography

External links

Push-starting a Lancia D50. www.streetfire.net (video)

Lancia Formula One cars
Formula One championship-winning cars